This article is about a newspaper; see Emanuel Hatzofe for the Israeli sculptor 
HaTzofe (The Observer) was a Hebrew-language daily newspaper published in Israel. In April 2007, it was reduced to weekly publication until its closing over a year later.

According to the paper's website, its point of view is Zionist, nationalist and religious. It claimed to be the only daily newspaper of the Israeli political right, with an emphasis on religious Zionism. The newspaper had been associated in its past to the Mizrachi movement as well as being the beacon of National Religious Party.

In the May 2003, Shlomo Ben-Tzvi purchased the newspaper and in 2004, he purchased the weekly Makor Rishon as well. On 25 April 2007, HaTzofe stopped publishing a daily edition, instead becoming a weekly insert in Makor Rishon which instead began daily operations. It printed its last edition on Friday, 26 December 2008.

See also
List of newspapers in Israel

References

External links
HaTzofe website 
HaTzofe at Historical Jewish Press

2008 disestablishments in Israel
Publications disestablished in 2008
Weekly newspapers
Hebrew-language newspapers
Religious Zionism
Jewish printing and publishing
Defunct newspapers published in Israel
Daily newspapers published in Israel